David Montejano (born 1948) is an American sociologist and historian.

Life
He graduated from the University of Texas at Austin, and from Yale University with a M.A. and Ph.D. in Sociology. He taught at the University of Texas at Austin, University of California, Santa Cruz, and the University of New Mexico.  He was the former Chair of the Center for Latino Policy Research at University of California, Berkeley.

In 1995, he was inducted into the Texas Institute of Letters.  From 1992-1998, he was State Commissioner of the Texas Commission on the Arts.

Awards
 1987–1988 National Endowment for the Humanities Resident Scholar 
 1988 Frederick Jackson Turner Award 
 Center for Advanced Study in the Behavioral Sciences Fellow at Stanford
 School of American Research Resident Scholar in Santa Fe
 Rockefeller Post-Doctoral Fellow

Works
 John Tutino, ed. (2012). "Mexican Merchants and Teamsters on the Texas Cotton Road, 1862-1865." Mexico and Mexicans in the Making of the United States. University of Texas Press. .
 Sancho's Journal: Exploring the Political Edge with the Brown Berets. University of Texas Press. 2012. .
 

Anglos y mexicanos en la formación de Texas: 1836-1986. Vol. 84. Consejo Nacional para la Cultura y las Artes, 1991.
 - Read online at Google Books

References

External links

1948 births
American sociologists
21st-century American historians
21st-century American male writers
University of Texas at Austin alumni
Yale University alumni
University of Texas at Austin faculty
University of California, Santa Cruz faculty
University of New Mexico faculty
University of California, Berkeley faculty
Living people
Historians from California
American male non-fiction writers